The 1939 Fordham Rams football team represented Fordham University as an independent during the 1939 college football season. Led by seventh-year head coach Jim Crowley, the Rams compiled a record of 6–2. The season opener against  was the first college football game ever broadcast on television. Fordham played home games at the Polo Grounds in Manhattan.

Schedule

References

Fordham
Fordham Rams football seasons
Fordham Rams football